La Grita Province was a province of the Spanish Empire in the 17th century (1576–1607), with La Grita (founded 1573) as its capital. In 1607 it merged with Mérida to form what became known as Mérida Province.

Provinces of the Spanish Empire
Geography of South America
History of South America
Colonial Venezuela
1576 establishments in New Spain
1607 disestablishments in New Spain